The Walls of Ávila, completed between the 11th and 14th centuries, are the defensive walls of Ávila, Spain, and its principal historic feature. These medieval fortifications are the most complete and best preserved in all the country. The Old Town of Ávila, including the walls and its extramural churches, was declared a UNESCO World Heritage Site in 1985.

Description 
The work was started in 1090 but most of the defensive wall appears to have been rebuilt in the 12th century. The nine gates were completed over several different periods. The apse of the cathedral also forms one of the towers. 

It is possible to walk upon the walls for roughly half the circumference. Whilst some of the walls will never be navigable in this way because of their integration into other structures, there is a large stretch of the walls that has yet to be made safe for pedestrians.

The site was registered as a National Monument in 1884. In 1985, the old city of Ávila and its extramural churches were declared a World Heritage site by UNESCO.

Gallery

References

External links 
 Official audio guide in English
 Walls of Ávila in Arteguias.com 
 Old Town of Ávila with its Extra-Muros Churches
 Murallas (Town Walls) of Ávila

Buildings and structures in Ávila, Spain
Avila
Bien de Interés Cultural landmarks in the Province of Ávila